IBMX (3-isobutyl-1-methylxanthine), like other methylated xanthine derivatives, is both a:
 competitive non-selective phosphodiesterase inhibitor which raises intracellular cAMP, activates PKA, inhibits TNFα and leukotriene synthesis, and reduces inflammation and innate immunity, and
 nonselective adenosine receptor antagonist.

As a phosphodiesterase inhibitor, IBMX has IC50 = 2–50 μM and does not inhibit PDE8 or PDE9.

References

Adenosine receptor antagonists
Phosphodiesterase inhibitors
Xanthines